Weiker Airport  is a privately owned public-use airport in Seneca County, Ohio, United States. It is located two nautical miles (4 km) southeast of the central business district of the village Green Springs. It is privately owned by Wayne Weiker.

Facilities and aircraft 
It has one runway designated 18/36 with a 1,744 by 90 ft (532 x 27 m) turf surface. For the 12-month period ending May 7, 2008, the airport had 320 aircraft operations, all of which were general aviation.

References

External links 

Defunct airports in Ohio
Airports in Ohio
Buildings and structures in Seneca County, Ohio
Transportation in Seneca County, Ohio